Luke Mitchell (born July 16, 2001) is an American soccer player who plays for the Creighton Bluejays in the NCAA Division 1.

Career 
Mitchell played for the U17 Colorado Rapids Developmental Academy team until the end of their 2018 season, when he joined the U19 Atlanta United FC Developmental Academy. He was named the Finalist MVP in the 2017 Colorado State Cup. Whilst with Atlanta, Mitchell appeared for Atlanta's United Soccer League affiliate Atlanta United 2 during their inaugural season in 2018.

References

External links

2001 births
Living people
American soccer players
Association football defenders
Atlanta United 2 players
USL Championship players
Soccer players from Colorado